Arthur Elgort (born June 8, 1940) is an American fashion photographer best known for his work with Vogue magazine.

Early life, family and education
Elgort was born in Brooklyn, New  York City, to Sophie (née Didimamoff) and Harry Elgort (April 10, 1908 – October 23, 1998), a  restaurant owner. He is of Russian-Jewish heritage. Raised in New York City, he attended Stuyvesant High School and Hunter College, where he studied painting. 

His nephew is stand-up comedian Sam Morril.

Career
Elgort began his career working as a photo assistant to Gosta "Gus" Peterson. Elgort's 1971 debut in British Vogue created a sensation in the Fashion Photography world where his soon-to-be iconic "snapshot" style and emphasis on movement and natural light liberated the idea of fashion photography.  In September 2008, he told Teen Vogue that he credited Mademoiselle for his big break: "They were really brave and gave me a chance. It was the first time I was shooting a cover instead of a half-page here or there." 

He worked for such magazines as Vogue and International Vogue, Glamour, GQ, Rolling Stone, and Teen Vogue, and shooting advertising campaigns with fashion labels as Chanel, Valentino, and Yves Saint Laurent. He continued to work for fashion publications, as well as working on 2009 advertising campaigns with Via Spiga and Liz Claiborne with Isaac Mizrahi. His work is exhibited in the permanent collections of the International Center of Photography in New York, in the Victoria and Albert Museum in London and in the Museum of Fine Arts in Houston, Texas. 

In 2011, Elgort won the CFDA Board of Directors' Award.

Personal life 
Elgort resides in New York City with his wife, Grethe Barrett Holby, who is a producer, stage director, choreographer, and dramaturge. They  have a daughter and two sons, one of whom is actor and singer Ansel Elgort.

Books

 Photographs of several super models like Christy Turlington, Paulina Porizkova, and Linda Evangelista

Films
Elgort made several films, including Colorado Cowboy that follows legendary cowboy, Bruce Ford, and which won the award for Best Cinematography at the Sundance Film Festival in 1994.
 Texas Tenor: The Illinois Jacquet Story 
 Colorado Cowboy: The Bruce Ford Story: Winner Best Cinematography at the Sundance Film Festival 1994

Exhibits
 "Arthur Elgort 1970-2010", Staley Wise Gallery

References

External links
 
 Arthur Elgort at ArtNet
 Arthur Elgort archive at Teen Vogue.com 

1940 births
Living people
American people of Russian-Jewish descent
American Ashkenazi Jews
Fashion photographers
Hunter College alumni
Jewish American artists
People from Brooklyn
Photographers from New York (state)
Stuyvesant High School alumni
21st-century American Jews